The 2005 Zentiva Czech Indoor Open was a women's tennis tournament played on indoor hard courts in Průhonice, Czech Republic. The event was part of the 2005 ITF Women's Circuit. It was the first edition of the tournament and it was held from 14 to 20 November 2005.

The final was played among czech players, Lucie Hradecka and Libuse Prusova won the title defeating Olga Vymetalkova and Eva Hrdinova in the final, 6–3, 3–6, 6–3.

Seeds

Draw

Draw

References

External links
Main Draw

2005 ITF Women's Circuit
2005 Women's Doubles